Lysophosphatidic acid receptor 5 also known as LPA5 is a protein that in humans is encoded by the LPAR5 gene. LPA5 is a G protein-coupled receptor that binds the lipid signaling molecule lysophosphatidic acid (LPA).

See also 
 Lysophospholipid receptor

References

Further reading 

 

G protein-coupled receptors